Souheil Ben-Barka (born 25 December 1942) is a Moroccan film director, screenwriter and film producer. He directed seven films between 1974 and 2002. His 1975 film La guerre du pétrole n'aura pas lieu was entered into the 9th Moscow International Film Festival. His 1983 film Amok won the Golden Prize at the 13th Moscow International Film Festival. In 1987 he was a member of the jury at the 15th Moscow International Film Festival.

Biography 
He was born in 1942 in Timbuktu, Mali. His father was a rich Moroccan merchant, and his mother was of Lebanese origin, her mother was of Armenian descent. He left Timbuktu at the age of 16. He spent a few years in Morocco before going to finish his higher education at Rome, Italy. One day in 1962, he happened to attend a film shooting on the street, the Italian filmmaker Federico Fellini was directing 8½. After this he decided to devote himself to the filmmaking. He studied sociology and got a Bachelor's degree, then he studied at the Centro sperimentale di cinematografia in Rome.

Filmography

References

External links

1942 births
Living people
Moroccan film directors
Moroccan screenwriters
Moroccan film producers
People from Timbuktu
Moroccan people of Lebanese descent